Eaglescott Airfield  is located in Burrington,  east southeast of Great Torrington, in Devon, England. It is also the northern operating base of the Devon Air Ambulance.

Eaglescott Aerodrome had a CAA Ordinary Licence (Number P742) that allowed flights for the public transport of passengers or for flying instruction as authorised by the licensee (Devon Airsports Limited). The aerodrome is not licensed for night use.

References

External links

Airports in Devon